Clinidium blomi is a species of ground beetle in the subfamily Rhysodinae. It was described by R.T. Bell in 1970. It is endemic to the High Plateau of Chiapas in southeastern Mexico.

Clinidium blomi measure  in length.

References

Clinidium
Beetles of North America
Endemic insects of Mexico
Beetles described in 1970